A Cloud Guru is an online training platform for people interested in Information Technology. Most of the courses offered prepare students to take certification exams for the three major cloud providers (Microsoft Azure, Google Cloud Platform, and Amazon Web Services).

History
In , Ant Stanley and Ryan Kroonenburg established the company in London, United Kingdom. They built the online training provider in four weeks from Ryan's bedroom, with Ryan's brother Sam Kroonenburg joining soon after.

In July 2016, Ant Stanley left A Cloud Guru, leaving Melbourne brothers Sam and Ryan to run the business.

A Cloud Guru raised $7 million in funding in July 2017, and an additional $33 million in April 2019.

On December 16, 2019, it was announced that the company would acquire Linux Academy. The company asserted that the acquisition would make it "the largest cloud computing training library in the world".

On June 2, 2021, A Cloud Guru was acquired by Pluralsight in a deal that valued the company at more than $2 billion.

See also
Pluralsight

References

External links
Company site

Internet properties established in 2015
Educational technology companies of Australia
Virtual learning environments
Learning management systems
Australian educational websites
Companies based in Melbourne
Australian companies established in 2015